Sunny Hill is a South Korean girl group (formerly a co-ed group) formed in 2007 by For Everyone Media. The group consists of Bitna, Kota, Eunju and Geonhee. Janghyun left the group in 2014 and Jubi and Misung left the group in 2019.

History

2007–2009: Debut with Love Letter and 2008 My Summer 
Sunny Hill debuted in September 2007 as a co-ed group consisting of members Janghyun, Jubi, and Seung Ah. Their first release was the single album Love Letter, which later won the Excellent Newcomer Album award. Following this success, the group released their second single album, 2008 My Summer. The group then had a musical hiatus, and only released various songs for film and drama soundtracks.

2010–2011: Label and line-up changes and Midnight Circus 
Following their musical hiatus, Sunny Hill unexpectedly changed labels to Nega Network, home of girl group Brown Eyed Girls. Nega Network later introduced a new member Kota for the group.

Sunny Hill was quickly thrown into their first project under Nega Network by featuring on Narsha's digital single "Mamma Mia". Janghyun did not vocally participate in the track, but was featured in the music video. The group quickly became known as "Narsha's Group", due to lack of popularity amongst fans of K-pop. Following promotions of "Mamma Mia", Nega Network introduced a new member for the group, Misung. The quintet released single "Pit-A-Pat" for the Korean drama The Greatest Love. The song attracted much attention and charted high.

Sunny Hill made another unexpected label change to LOEN Entertainment. On June 3, 2011, Sunny Hill's first extended play, Midnight Circus with the lead single being the title track. On August 4, 2011, Sunny Hill released their follow-up ballad, "Pray". The song continued the group's growing popularity and charted on the Top 10 of the Gaon Chart, despite there being no live promotions.

2012–2013: Antique Romance and Young Folk 
On January 13, 2012, Sunny Hill made their comeback with their first maxi-single "The Grasshoppers". On January 20, it was announced that Janghyun would be entering his mandatory military service on January 31. The single peaked at the Top 3 of the Gaon Chart.

On April 14, it was announced that Sunny Hill would be making comeback as four-member girl group with digital single, "Is the White Horse Coming?". Sunny Hill released their digital single Is The White Horse Coming? on April 19.
The next day, it was reported that the song had topped in the several music site such as Soribada, Melon, Mnet, and Bugs.

On December 6, Sunny Hill's second extended play, Antique Romance with the lead single "Goodbye to Romance". The track was said to be about the members' first love story. The album was successful and both songs of the album reached the Top 10 songs in Gaon Chart.

On April 5, Sunny Hill released collaboration single Love Actually with South Korean modern rock group called Daybreak, as a part of project album Re:code - Episode III. Misung also participated as co-produced and co-wrote for the song. On April 6, the music video was released featured cameo appearances from comedian Kim Sungwon, Defconn, and ZE:A member Kwanghee. The collaboration single was peaked at #7.

On June 10, it was announced that Sunny Hill would be making comeback with their third extended play, Young Folk. The lead single would be folk music with featured folk musician Hareem. The same day, the group held a showcase announcing their comeback. Sunny Hill official released their third extended play, Young Folk on June 19 and charted high on real-time charts.

On August 13, Kota was featured in a duet with SS501's Kim Hyung-jun entitled "Always Love You", a special digital single, with a release of a video teaser on August 8. The song is an acoustic medium R&B produced by Kim Hyung Jun himself, while the music video has an innocent love story theme, filmed on Hanseo University's airfield.

On October 30, 2013, Leader Janghyun was discharged from his military service.

2014–2017: Janghyun's departure, reformation as girl group, Sunny Blues, Way, and contract expiration 
On January 17, LOEN announced that Sunny Hill would be returned as co-ed group with their third digital single Don't Say Anything. It was announced that Janghyun's the last participated with the group before departure to pursue his career as a producer. Sunny Hill official released their third digital single Don't Say Anything for the last time as co-ed group on January 24.

Sunny Hill released their first studio album, Sunny Blues, separated into Part A and Part B, seven years after their debut. They released Sunny Blues Part A, consisting of eight tracks with the lead single "Monday Blues" on August 21, 2014.Sunny Blues Part B released on January 29, 2015, consists of nine tracks with the lead single "Child in Time".

Sunny Hill released their fourth single album Way with the lead single "On the Way Home" on August 29, 2016. The song is an upbeat mix of old pop and electronic that depicts the story about one's desires to return home, and get away from the tough side of reality.

On August 18, 2017, LOEN Entertainment released a statement announcing that Sunny Hill had left the label and would continue as a group elsewhere.

2019–present: Second line-up changes and comeback with Nom Nom Nom 

On April 25, 2019, Sunny Hill joined BOD Entertainment. The group remained with Bitna (formerly SeungAh), Kota and two new members Eunju (formerly a soloist under the name "Ray.B") and Geonhee (former member of Purfles) after Jubi and Misung had chosen to leave the group.

On October 14, 2019, the group announced they would be having a comeback on October 22, although this was later delayed to October 25.

Recently Kota auditioned to be part of the new project group WSG Wannabe and made it in, pausing her activities within Sunny Hill to participate.

Band members 

Current members
Bitna 
Kota 
Eunju 
Geonhee 

Former members
Jubi 
Misung 
Janghyun

Timeline

Discography

Studio albums

Extended plays

Single albums

Singles

Collaborations

Soundtrack appearances

Music videos

Awards

References

Kakao M artists
South Korean pop music groups
K-pop music groups
South Korean girl groups
Melon Music Award winners